Pseudoeurycea brunnata is a species of salamander in the family Plethodontidae.
It was formerly only found in a few disjunct populations in Guatemala and southern Mexico. 
Its natural habitat is subtropical or tropical moist montane forests.
It is considered a critically endangered species because population numbers have declined by more than 80% over the last 10 years.

References

Pseudoeurycea
Taxonomy articles created by Polbot
Amphibians described in 1955